is a Japanese actor, voice actor and narrator. He is the Japanese voice-over for Sammo Hung, and is the Japanese voice of Wakko.

In the 1980s, He proved to be a popular choice for many Japanese animation studios for the roles of male heart-throbs in many shojo anime. In May 2020, Mizushima announced he will take a hiatus in order to undergo vocal cord polyp surgery.

Biography

Filmography

Television animation
1970s
 Chojin Sentai Barattack (1977) – Mac
 Choudenji Machine Voltes V (1977) – Young Ragooru
 Galaxy Express 999 (1978) – Beethoven
 Dokaben (1979) – Tomoaki Takashiro
 Hana no Ko Lunlun (1979) – Serge Flora (Selge)
1980s
 Space Emperor God Sigma (1980) – Kajio
 Beast King GoLion (1981) – Isamu Kurogane ("Lance")
 Six God Combination Godmars (1981) – Mars/Takeru Myoujin
 Tokimeki Tonight (1982) – Shun Makabe
 Creamy Mami, the Magic Angel (1983) – Toshio Otomo
 Persia, the Magic Fairy (1984) – Riki Muroi
 Magical Emi, the Magic Star (1985) as Shou Yuuki
 Obake no Q-Taro (1985) – Shinichi
 Pastel Yumi, the Magic Idol (1986) as Kyouhei Misawa
 Saint Seiya (1986) – Lizard Misty, Sid, Bud
 Tekken Chinmi (1988) – Raochu
 Ulysses 31 (1988) – Telemachos
1990s
 Akazukin Chacha (1994) – Franken-chan
 Detective Conan (1996) – Toshihiko Takasugi
 Hakugei: Legend of the Moby Dick (1997) – General Ho
 Kindaichi Case Files (1999) – Sudou (ep 100)
2000s
 .hack//Intermezzo (2002) – Male Heavyblade
 L/R: Licensed by Royalty (2003) – Rocky
 Requiem from the Darkness (2003) – Gunhachirou (Momosuke's brother)
 Submarine Super 99 (2003) – Gorô Oki
 Fullmetal Alchemist (2004) – Scar's Brother
 Kaiketsu Zorori (2004) – Goburu
 Madlax (2004) – Luciano
 Yu-Gi-Oh! Duel Monsters (2004) – Rare Hunter (ep 68); Light Mask (ep 70–74); Bobasa
 Naruto (2005) – Mondai (ep 161)
 Tsubasa Chronicle (2005) – Sakura's Father
 Black Cat (2006) – Doctor (Kanzaki)
 Pocket Monsters: Diamond and Pearl (2009) – Gen/Riley
2010s
 Saint Seiya Omega (2013) – Equuleus Subaru 
 Parasyte (2014) – Takeshi Hirokawa
 Kirakira PreCure a la Mode (2017) – Elder
 One Piece (2017) – Napoleon, Zeus, Prometheus, Kawamatsu
2020s
 Oda Cinnamon Nobunaga (2020) – Ichiko's father
 Dragon Quest: The Adventure of Dai (2021) – Brokeena

OVA
 Fire Tripper (1986) – Shukomaru
 Black Magic M-66 (1987) – Leakey
 Devilman (1987) – Ryo Asuka
 Digital Devil Story (1987) – Akemi Nakajima
 Spirit Warrior (1988) – Tenshu
 Legend of the Galactic Heroes (1989) – Neithardt Müller
 Mario World: Mario to Yoshi no Bōken Land (1991) – Luigi
 Black Jack (1998) – Yasuhiko Shirabyoshi

Theatrical animation
 Kimagure Orange Road (1985) – Kyōsuke Kasuga
 Guyver: Out of Control (1986) – Sho Fukamachi/Guyver
 Super Mario Bros.: The Great Mission to Rescue Princess Peach! (1986) – Luigi
 The Rose of Versailles: I'll Love You – Long – I Live (1987) – Andre
 Saint Seiya: The Movie (1987) – Orion Jäger
 Neo Tokyo (1987) – Tsutomo Sugioka
 Cyborg 009 Vs. Devilman (2015) – Chang Changku/006
 Crayon Shin-chan: Burst Serving! Kung Fu Boys ~Ramen Rebellion~ (2018)

Tokusatsu
 Juken Sentai Gekiranger (2007) – Master Elehung Kam Po (eps. 10 - 12, 18, 23, 28, 32, 36, 49)
 Zyuden Sentai Kyoryuger (2013) – Sorrowful Knight Aigaron (eps. 1 - 11, 13, 16 - 17, 19, 21 - 26, 28 - 30, 32 - 34, 36 - 39, 42 - 46) (voice), President (ep. 28, 44) (actor)
 Zyuden Sentai Kyoryuger vs. Go-Busters: The Great Dinosaur Battle! Farewell Our Eternal Friends (2014) – Sorrowful Knight Aigaron
 Kaettekita Zyuden Sentai Kyoryuger 100 Years After (2014) – Jealousy Knight Hoshigaron

Dubbing

Live-action
Sammo Hung
Enter the Fat Dragon – Ah Lung
By Hook or by Crook – Fatso
Encounters of the Spooky Kind – Bold Cheung
Project A – Fei
Winners and Sinners – "Teapot"
Wheels on Meals – Moby
Heart of Dragon – Danny / Dodo Fung
My Lucky Stars – "Eric" / "Kidstuff" / "Fastbuck" / "Chi Koo Choi"
Twinkle, Twinkle Lucky Stars – "Eric" / "Kidstuff" / "Fastbuck" / "Chi Koo-choi"
Lucky Stars Go Places – "Eric" / "Kidstuff" / "Fastbuck" / "Chi Koo-choi"
Millionaires Express – Ching Fong-Tin
Eastern Condors – Tung Ming-sun
Mr. Vampire III – Hung
Dragons Forever – Wong Fei-Hung / Luke Wang
Lai Shi, China's Last Eunuch – Liu Lai Shi's teacher
Island of Fire – Fatty John Liu Hsi Chia
Martial Law – Sammo Law
The Legend of Zu – Grandmaster White Brows
Around the World in 80 Days (2008 TV Tokyo edition) – Wong Fei Hung / Tiger #2
Dragon Squad – Kong Long
SPL: Sha Po Lang – Wong Po
Three Kingdoms: Resurrection of the Dragon – Luo Ping'an
Ip Man 2 – Hung Chun-nam
A Simple Life – Director Hung
The Last Tycoon – Huang Jinrong
The Bodyguard – Ding Hu
Matthew Perry
Friends – Chandler Bing
Three to Tango – Oscar Novak
The Whole Nine Yards – Nicholas "Oz" Oseransky
The Whole Ten Yards – Nicholas "Oz" Oseransky
Mark Hamill
Star Wars Episode IV: A New Hope (1985 NTV edition) – Luke Skywalker
Star Wars Episode V: The Empire Strikes Back (1986 NTV edition) – Luke Skywalker
Star Wars Episode VI: Return of the Jedi (1988 NTV edition) – Luke Skywalker
Jay and Silent Bob Strike Back – Cocknocker
3 Idiots – Chatur Ramalingam (Omi Vaidya)
8 Simple Rules – Paul Hennessy (John Ritter)
Bewitched – Ritchie (Jason Schwartzman)
Big Trouble in Little China – Wang Chi (Dennis Dun)
Casualties of War – Private Max Eriksson (Michael J. Fox)
Enter the Fat Dragon – Thor (Wong Jing)
Good Morning, Vietnam – Edward Garlick (Forest Whitaker)
The Karate Kid (1988 TV Asahi edition) – Daniel LaRusso (Ralph Macchio)
Mars Attacks! – Jason Stone (Michael J. Fox)
Spider-Man 2 – Mr. Aziz (Aasif Mandvi)
T. J. Hooker – Officer Vince Romano (Adrian Zmed)

Animation
Animaniacs – Wakko Warner
Johnny Test – Johnny Test
The Little Mermaid – Harold the Seahorse
Mighty Orbots - Rob Simmons
Sitting Ducks – Bill

Singing
Warrior of Love Rainbowman both 1972 and 1982 openings, 1972 first ending (as Kenji Yasunaga)

Awards

References

External links
 
 
 

1956 births
Living people
Japanese male video game actors
Japanese male voice actors
Japanese television personalities
Japanese television presenters
Male voice actors from Tokyo
Nihon University alumni
20th-century Japanese male actors